Pholidophoristion is an extinct genus of stem-teleost ray-finned fish that lived in what is now Europe from the Late Jurassic to the Early Cretaceous.

References

Prehistoric teleostei
Prehistoric ray-finned fish genera
Late Jurassic fish of Europe
Early Cretaceous fish of Europe
Jurassic England
Fossils of England
Jurassic France
Fossils of France
Jurassic Germany
Cretaceous Germany
Fossils of Germany
Fossil taxa described in 1941
Taxa named by Arthur Smith Woodward